Kesar Lall (15 July 1926 – 26 December 2012) (alternative name: Kesar Lall Shrestha) was a Nepalese folklorist and writer. He has published more than 50 books of stories and poetry. He wrote in Nepali, Nepal Bhasa and English.

Early life

Kesar Lall was born in Kathmandu to father Jagat Lal and mother Bal Kumari Shrestha. His father ran a school at his home in Māsan Galli (मासं गल्लि), and was popularly known as Jagat Lal Master. This was one of the few places that provided a modern education in Nepal in those days as the Rana government discouraged the establishment of schools. Kesar Lall received no formal schooling. He learnt English from his father and taught himself to write composition by studying varied text books.

Writing career

Kesar Lall began his writing career in 1945 by writing articles in English for Indian magazines. In 1953, he published his first story entitled Bhutucha ("Short girl") in Nepal Bhasa in Nepal magazine. He published his first book of folk tales entitled Lore and Legend of Nepal in English in 1961.

Kesar Lall is best known as a storyteller who exposed Nepal's folklore to the world by collecting, translating and publishing tales told in various Nepalese communities. He traveled across the country, listening to stories and taking down notes in longhand later at home because he said people were shy speaking in front of a tape recorder. He was also a poet and his poetry has been described as being simple and poignant.

While continuing to write, Kesar Lall pursued various jobs. In 1951, following the overthrow of the Rana regime and the installation of a new government, Kesar Lall secured a position as assistant private secretary to Prime Minister Matrika Prasad Koirala. He also worked for BP Koirala when he was home minister. Kesar Lall joined the US Embassy in Kathmandu in the late 1950s as advisor and translator where he remained until his retirement in 1985.

References

1926 births
2012 deaths
People from Kathmandu
Nepalese male poets
Newar-language writers
Nepali-language writers
Folklorists
20th-century Nepalese poets
20th-century male writers
Nepalese folklorists